Shijimi can refer to:
 29431 Shijimi, an asteroid
 Shijimi (clam), Corbicula japonica, a shellfish used in Japanese cuisine